Frank Baker (born 1968) is an American politician who represents District 3 on the Boston City Council. He was first elected on November 8, 2011.

Personal life
Baker is the 12th child of John and Eileen Baker, and was raised in Saint Margaret's Parish (now St. Teresa of Calcutta), which is better known as the Savin Hill section of Dorchester. He graduated in 1986 from Don Bosco Technical High School where he has studied printing trade. Between 1987 and 2010 he worked in the printing department at the City of Boston. He is a member of the CWA/Boston Typographical Union. He is married to his wife Today and they have two children.

Political career
Baker was first elected to the Boston City Council representing District 3 in 2011. Incumbent District 3 Council Maureen Feeney declined to run for reelection, and a large field of candidates ran to replace her. Baker faced John O'Toole in the general election, with Baker running out of the northern part of the district in Savin Hill, and O'Toole drawing his support from the southern part of the district in Adams Village and Neponset. The race was widely seen at the time as a contest between then-Mayor Thomas Menino and State Representative and Boston Building Trades' chief Marty Walsh, with Menino backing O'Toole, and Walsh backing Baker. Baker won, receiving 5,262 votes to O'Toole's 4,120.

Baker is the chair of the Jobs, Wages, and Workforce Development Committee and the Special Committee on Charter Reform. He is vice chair of the Planning, Development and Transportation Committee as well as a member of the committees on Census and Redistricting, City, Neighborhood Services and Veterans Affairs, Government Operations, Homelessness, Mental Health and Recovery, Housing and Community Development, and Ways and Means. Baker is affiliated with the Democratic Party.

In 2016, while chairing the Charter Reform Committee, he proposed that council members serve four year terms, not two year terms.  His arguments include that the members running for reelection spent much of the second year running and not focusing on the Council and that the city could save approximately $1.6 million by not having elections in low turn out years.  The council vote 8–1 in favor but at the time, it was not clear what Mayor Marty Walsh thought about the proposal.  He would need to sign off on the proposal and send it to the State House for a vote in order for it to take effect.

In 2023, Baker and Erin Murphy were the only two City Council members to vote against advancing a home rule petition asking the state to allow the city to implement proposals by Mayor Michelle Wu to reform the Boston Planning & Development Agency and to enact a form of rent control.

In 2023, Baker is being challenged by Joel Richards, a Boston Public School teacher and member of the Democratic Socialists of America's local chapter. Richards finished 3rd in the 2021 election in District 4, and after the 2022 redistricting process significant portions of that district are now part of Baker's District 3.

Election Results

2019

2017

2015

2013

2011

References

Boston City Council members
Living people
People from Dorchester, Massachusetts
Don Bosco Technical High School (Boston) alumni
Massachusetts Democrats
21st-century American politicians
1968 births